The Greatest Love is a 2016 Philippine family melodrama television series directed by Dado C. Lumibao, Jeffrey R. Jeturian and Mervyn Brondial, starring Sylvia Sanchez, Nonie Buencamino, Andi Eigenmann, Dimples Romana, Arron Villaflor, Matt Evans, Joshua Garcia, and Ruby Ruiz. The series premiered on September 5, 2016, to April 21, 2017, and worldwide on The Filipino Channel replacing Tubig at Langis and was replaced by Pusong Ligaw.

The program marks the reunion of Ellen Adarna and Ejay Falcon who were among the lead stars of Pasión de Amor, a Filipino version of Pasión de Gavilanes, aired on ABS-CBN.

Series overview

Episode

Premise
The Greatest Love begins with aspiring photographer Gloria (Ellen Adarna) and her love story with a boatman named Peter (Ejay Falcon). Despite the fact that they love each other, Gloria is forced under duress by her father to marry Andres Alegre (Junjun Quintana), the town mayor's nephew who raped her.

Through the years, Gloria (Sylvia Sanchez) is a loving and selfless mother to Amanda (Dimples Romana), Andrei (Matt Evans), Paeng (Arron Villaflor), and Lizelle (Andi Eigenmann). To her children's perception, their father is a hard working OFW who visits from time to time. They live in the Alegre ancestral family home. Andres does not remit funds regularly so Gloria compensates by collecting, buying and selling junk. When their father comes to visit, they are a picture of a happy family.

At the root of their family's problems are her children's misconceptions that their mother was unfaithful to their father, the late Andres. Gloria refuses to sully their memory of their father, so she never admits to them that she was raped by Andres.

The breaking point is when they discover that Lizelle is an illegitimate child, the result of Peter and Gloria's illicit love affair, when Andres abandons them.

This long-kept secret shatters their happy family, and Gloria's children leave her one by one. As Gloria struggles to keep her family together, she starts to show symptoms of dementia and begins to lose pieces of her memory. She initially brushes off the symptoms until she is finally diagnosed with Alzheimer's disease.

As her illness progresses, Gloria attempts to bring back the love her family once had for each other; however, it becomes more difficult as she races against time while trying to gather her memories before they are completely wiped out. Peter (Nonie Buencamino) returns to Gloria’s life and together they try to mend her children's relationship with her and each other.

Cast and characters

Main cast

Supporting cast

Special participation

 Jana Agoncillo as Leklek
 Marnie Lapuz as Adela Sunico
 Allan Paule as Samuel
 Kamille Filoteo as Liza Alcantara
 Lance Lucido as Buboy
 Mara Lopez as young Stella
 Anna Luna as young Lydia
 Anne Feo as Gloria’s mother
 Ashley Sarmiento as Gloria, age 10
 Francine Diaz as adolescent Gloria
 Jane Oineza as young adult Amanda
 Teejay Marquez as young adult Andrei
 John Manalo as young adult Paeng
 Hannah Lopez Vito as young Lizelle
 Michelle Vito as teen Amanda
 Nathaniel Britt as teen Andrei
 Luke Alford as teen Paeng
 Juvylyn Bison as young Amanda
 Angeluo Alayon as young Andrei
 Raikko Mateo as young Paeng

Episodes

Reception

Production

Timeslot and premiere
The Greatest Love was reported to replace the soon-to-be concluded My Super D on July 18, 2016, but was postponed (and moved to later date) because of Pinoy Big Brother: Mga Kwento ng Dream Team ni Kuya. The network released several teasers of the show and announced a premiere date which is on September 5, 2016. A full length trailer was released on August 27, 2016.

See also
 List of programs broadcast by ABS-CBN
 List of telenovelas of ABS-CBN

References

ABS-CBN drama series
Philippine melodrama television series
2016 Philippine television series debuts
2017 Philippine television series endings
Philippine LGBT-related television shows
Television shows set in the Philippines
Filipino-language television shows
2010s LGBT-related drama television series